Jeremy Su'a (born 10 November 1988) is a Samoan rugby union footballer. Su'a attended Westfields Sports High School in Sydney's South West alongside Tongan International Sitiveni Mafi and the likes of rugby league superstars Jarryd Hayne and Israel Folau. Su'a played his Junior rugby at the Parramatta Two Blues Rugby club and in 2006 played for the Australian Schoolboys.
Moving through the age groups Su'a was a member of the Australian U19 team in 2007 and Australian U20 Team in 2008. He currently plays for the Worcester Warriors in the Aviva Premiership and Samoa, and usually plays as a scrum-half.
He was part of the Samoan team at the 2011 Rugby World Cup where he played in two matches.

Su'a was named in the  squad for the 2013 Super Rugby season but played no super rugby matches. He signed with the Worcester Warriors for the 2013/2014 season.

References

External links
 ESPN Profile
 itsrugby.co.uk profile

1988 births
Living people
Rugby union players from Wellington City
New Zealand sportspeople of Samoan descent
Samoan rugby union players
Samoa international rugby union players
Rugby union scrum-halves
Tasman rugby union players
Worcester Warriors players
Samoan emigrants to Australia